Sergio Augusto Chan Lugo (born 16 August 1967) is a Mexican politician affiliated with the PAN. He served as Deputy of the LXII Legislature of the Mexican Congress representing Yucatán, having previously served in the Congress of Yucatán from 1998 to 2001.

References

1967 births
Living people
Politicians from Yucatán (state)
People from Mérida, Yucatán
National Action Party (Mexico) politicians
21st-century Mexican politicians
Members of the Congress of Yucatán
20th-century Mexican politicians
Deputies of the LXII Legislature of Mexico
Members of the Chamber of Deputies (Mexico) for Yucatán